Coremagnatha is a genus of moths of the family Erebidae. The genus was erected by George Hampson in 1924.

The Global Lepidoptera Names Index gives this name as a synonym of Mamerthes H. Druce, 1891.

Species
Coremagnatha cyanocraspis Hampson, 1924 Trinidad
Coremagnatha orionalis (Walker, [1859]) Brazil

References

Herminiinae